Magallanes, officially the Municipality of Magallanes, is a 2nd class municipality in the province of Sorsogon, Philippines. According to the 2020 census, it has a population of 37,411 people.

According to renowned historians and anthropologists such as Domingo Abella, Luis Camara Dery, Merito Espinas, F. Mallari, Norman Owen, Mariano Goyena del Prado, et al., Magallanes was the location of the ancient settlement of Ibalong.

History

In 1569, the Jimenez-Orta expedition landed at Barangay Ginangra near the village of Gibal-ong, the site where the first mass in the island of Luzon was said, the site of the first Christian settlement. Magallanes started as settlement called Parina, a name derived from the hardwood tree reputed to be so durable as to last for centuries that was known to abound in the place long before it became a barrio of Pueblo de Casiguran under the old province of Albay.

This settlement was not spared from sporadic sorties launched by punitive bands from the south, that in 1854 one group of that band ravage Ginangra and took as hostage one family from the village.  As a countermeasure, the Spanish Comandancia of Parina constructed a watchtower in such strategic places as Telegrapo and Bagatao which were equipped with cannons and manned around the clock. Cannon also was mounted in Cañonera the present site of Binisitahan del Norte at the mouth of Incarizan River.

On July 16, 1860, the name Parina was changed to Magallanes in honor of the Portuguese who discovered the Philippines island in 1521 Ferdinand Magellan.  Magallanes was officially declared a pueblo with Don Manuel de Castro as its first appointed governadorcillo. In 1864 the Parish of our Lady of Mt. Carmel was canonically established with Rev. Fr. Higino de Castro as its first pastor.  It was during this year that the first census was conducted resulting to a total count of 1400 inhabitants.  Moreover, the town was split into six cabeseras each of which was entrusted to the administrative supervision of a cebeja de barangay.

Pursuant to the decree of the Spanish Crown, new official with new corresponding titles were elected. Don Juan de Castro was chosen as the first Capitan Municipal in 1894.  In 1901 the municipality elected its first set of official under the American.  Don Inocencio M. Mella was elected Presidente Municipal under the Malolos Constitution.

Geography

Barangays
Magallanes is politically subdivided into 34 barangays.

Climate

Demographics

Economy

Magallanes is primary considered a coastal town as 24 of its 34 barangays are situated along the seashore and with the abundant marine resource, the natives take to the sea daily for their food and livelihood.

Marine and fishpond fishing are the town's prime industry despite large agricultural lands being engaged as well in crop and livestock production. Fish drying is a common practice among the locals after which the produce is sold to neighboring towns. For the fishpond culture, they are able to produce milkfish, tilapia, prawns and mud crab.  The variety of ways the marine and inland fishing produce are processed include sardine in oil, bangus in oil, dried posit, dilis tuyo, daing and tinapa.

Sardine and Bangus in Oil are OTOP products processed by the Magallanes Food Products while the dried and smoke fish are processed by the Bacolod Women's Cooperative and by the fish folks themselves.

Crops production of rice, corn, coconut, fruit trees, vegetables and root cops make an abundant produce for the town. Of these crops, coconut accounts about 96.15% making it the dominant major product.

References

External links
 Magallanes Profile at PhilAtlas.com
 [ Philippine Standard Geographic Code]
 Philippine Census Information
 Local Governance Performance Management System

Municipalities of Sorsogon